Solomon & Sheba is a 1995 American television biblical film directed by Robert M. Young and starring Halle Berry and Jimmy Smits. It premiered on Showtime on February 26, 1995. It was nominated for an Image Award in 1996.

Plot summary

Cast
 Halle Berry as Nikhaule / Queen Sheba
 Jimmy Smits as King Solomon
 Miguel Brown as House Keeper
 Norman Buckley as Israelite 1
 Ali Cherkaoui as The Scribe 
 Kenneth Colley as Nathan
 Nickolas Grace as Jeroboam
 Chapman Roberts as King Yusef

References

External links
 

1995 television films
1995 films
Films set in the 10th century BC
Films set in Israel
Films set in Jordan
Films directed by Robert M. Young
Films scored by David Kitay
Films about Solomon
1995 romantic drama films
1990s historical films
Films set in antiquity
American historical romance films
Showtime (TV network) films
1990s American films